"Slight Rebellion off Madison" is a short story written by J. D. Salinger in 1941 and first published in the December 21, 1946 issue of The New Yorker.  It would become the basis for his famous novel The Catcher in the Rye, which contains a modified version of Slight Rebellion off Madison as chapter 17. It includes a few early versions of characters from The Catcher in the Rye such as Carl Luce (then portrayed as a fat, unattractive boy from Pencey) and George Harrison of Andover, who later becomes a "jerk in a dark gray flannel suit and checkered vest. Strictly Ivy League".

Summary
In the story, a young Holden Caulfield first meets up with Sally to go ice skating. After a bit of small talk with her, Holden reveals his true thoughts about his perceived pointlessness of preparatory school, telling her he's "in bad shape." He continues and brings up the idea of moving with her far away from the city, but Sally dismisses this as an absurd fantasy. Later, Holden and Carl Luce appear at the Wadsworth bar, where they drink scotch and sodas. Holden addresses Carl as an "intellectual guy" and asks him hypothetically what he would do if he hated school and wanted to "get the hell out of New York." Holden receives a response similar to Sally's, and is dismissed. Alone, Holden drunkenly calls Sally twice on a payphone. Then, after chatting with the piano player at the bar in the bathroom, Holden waits for a bus on the corner of Madison Avenue, with tears in his eyes.

History
This short story marked Salinger's debut in The New Yorker, and he was elated when the news came from his agent, Dorothy Olding, that the editors had accepted it. However, publication was postponed due to the war.

References

1946 short stories
Short stories by J. D. Salinger
Works originally published in The New Yorker